Protinopalpa is a genus of moths of the family Crambidae.

Species
Protinopalpa ferreoflava Strand, 1911
Protinopalpa subclathrata Strand, 1911

References

Natural History Museum Lepidoptera genus database

Pyraustinae
Crambidae genera
Taxa named by Embrik Strand